Jahsh (جحش) is an Arabic male given name that was used before the era of Islam. Jahsh means "mule" in Arabic.

list
Jahsh ibn Riyab, companion of Muhammad
Ubayd-Allah ibn Jahsh (c. 588-627), one of the four monotheistic hanifs, first cousin of Muhammad
Abd-Allah Jahsh (c. 586 - 625), brother-in-law and companion of Muhammad
Zaynab bint Jahsh (c. 590 - 614), first cousin and wife of Muhammad
Abdu ibn Jahsh (c. 586 - 625), brother-in-law and companion of Muhammad
Hammanah bint Jahsh (d. after 641), companion and first cousin of Muhammad
Habiba bint Jahsh, companion and first cousin of Muhammad

See also
Arabic Name

Arabic masculine given names